Marjorie Katherine Mestayer (1880 – 7 September 1955) was a New Zealand curator and conchologist. She is best known for the molluscan, foraminiferal and ostracod species named after her. Beginning as an amateur shell enthusiast, she went on to work as a conchology curator for the Dominion Museum in Wellington. She also received grants for her conchology research. She donated scientific and personal collections to the Museum of New Zealand Te Papa Tongarewa.

History 
In 1880, Mestayer was born in England. Her family migrated to Australia when she was 2, and to Wellington when she was 12. Her father, Richart Mestayer, was "an amateur naturalist with interests in things microscopic, like foraminifera. Undoubtedly his enthusiasm for the natural world rubbed off on Marjorie".

From her teens, Mestayer began collecting and analysing shells. At first her displays and publications were in support of other conchologists, including Tom Iredale. Later, independently, she collected and analysed sands and dredgings from New Zealand shorelines including Titahi Bay and deep-water dredgings provided by Captain John Peter Bollins.

Mestayer was the conchologist at the Dominion Museum between 1907 and 1932. She also donated specimens to the Auckland Museum, where her frequent correspondent, Baden Powell, was the chief conchologist. Her works included 18 publications between 1907 and 1930. She focused on gastropods and chitons. Much of her work turned out to be synonyms or replication, due to issues in obtaining current literature. Much of her work is still considered to be valid.

As a Wellington resident, Mestayer was active with the St. John Ambulance Association and the Anglican church. She was also the subject of a popular culture profile in the newspaper NZ Truth:
Mestayer died in 1955. In 2017, Mestayer was selected as one of the Royal Society Te Apārangi's "150 women in 150 words", a project celebrating the contributions of women to expanding knowledge in New Zealand.

Species  
Species named in honour of Marjorie Mestayer are:
 Lepidoplerus mestayerae
 Parachiton mestayerae
 Lima mestayerae (Pleistocene)
 Cumia mestayerae
 Cyclochlamys mestayerae
 Eulimella mestayerae
 Perrierina mestayerae

Selected works
 Mestayer, Marjorie K., "New Zealand Mollusca No. 3", Transactions and Proceedings of the Royal Society of New Zealand 56 (1926): 583–587.
 Mestayer, Marjorie K., "A Note on Sigapatella terraenovae Peile. A new Montfortula." Transactions and Proceedings of the Royal Society of New Zealand. 59 (1928): 622–624.
 Mestayer, Marjorie K., "Notes on New Zealand Mollusca No. 4." Transactions and Proceedings of the Royal Society of New Zealand. 60 (1930): 247–250
 Mestayer, Marjorie K., "Notes on New Zealand Mollusca No. 5," Transactions and Proceedings of the Royal Society of New Zealand. 61 (1930): 144–146

References

External links 
 Marjorie Mestayer collections at Te Papa. 
 Cumia mestayerae at New Zealand Mollusks. 
 Cyclochlamys mestayerae at New Zealand Mollusks. 
 Parachiton mestayerae at New Zealand Molluscs.

1880 births
1955 deaths
New Zealand curators
20th-century New Zealand women scientists
Scientists from Wellington City
New Zealand women curators
Conchologists
English emigrants to Australia
Australian emigrants to New Zealand
People associated with the Museum of New Zealand Te Papa Tongarewa
20th-century New Zealand zoologists